Randy Bryden (born January 20, 1970) is a Canadian curler from Regina, Saskatchewan.

Bryden is most notable for winning the 1996 Canadian Mixed Curling Championship for Saskatchewan with teammates Cathy Trowell, Russ Bryden and Karen Inglis.

Bryden has yet to represent his province at the Brier. He has won two career World Curling Tour events, winning the Horizon Laser Vision Center Classic in 2010 and the Dauphin Clinic Pharmacy Classic in 2012.

Bryden represented Saskatchewan at the 2022 Canadian Senior Curling Championships.

References

External links
 
 Canadian Mixed - Past Champions - tsn.ca

1970 births
Living people
Curlers from Regina, Saskatchewan
Canadian male curlers
Canadian mixed curling champions